Saridoscelis is a genus of moths of the family Yponomeutidae.

Species
Saridoscelis issikii - Moriuti, 1961 
Saridoscelis kodamai - Moriuti, 1961 
Saridoscelis nudata - Meyrick, 1913 
Saridoscelis sphenias - Meyrick, 1894 
Saridoscelis synodias - Meyrick, 1932 

Yponomeutidae